Harridan may refer to:

 Harridan, stereotype of an unpleasant, belligerent, bossy woman; essentially synonymous with shrew (stock character)
 Miss Harridan, the main antagonist of the 2003 comedy film Daddy Day Care
 Herrena the Henna-Haired Harridan, a minor antagonist in the Discworld universe of novels.
 Harridan, a song by Porcupine Tree